The .338 Marlin Express is a cartridge developed by Marlin Firearms and Hornady.  It is based on the .376 Steyr with a goal to duplicate the venerable .30-06 Springfield's performance in a cartridge compatible with lever-action firearms. The cartridge uses a slightly shorter, rimmed case to function in lever-action rifles with tubular magazines.  As introduced in Hornady's LEVERevolution line of cartridges, it follows the design logic of the .308 Marlin Express which preceded it. The .338MX fires heavier .338 caliber bullets than the .308 Marlin Express at roughly the same velocity. It is chambered in Marlin's Model 338MX and 338MXLR rifles using the Marlin Model 336 action.

Design History and Cartridge Performance
Whereas the .308 Marlin Express began by modifying the .307 Winchester, Hornady and Marlin engineers started with a previous collaboration between Hornady and the Austrian arms maker Steyr, the .376 Steyr, when designing the .338 Marlin Express. The case of the .376 Steyr was given a thicker web for added strength, then necked down to .338. The .308 Marlin Express, on the other hand, was made with a thinner web than its parent case, the .307 Winchester, for additional capacity. Although the thicker case webbing reduced capacity, new powders allow the .338 Marlin Express to achieve velocities similar to the .338 Federal with significantly lower pressures. Hornady engineers then looked to the projectile for the new cartridge. They settled on the 200-grain .338 projectile from their .338 Winchester Magnum line. The existing bullet was remade with a thinner jacket in order to promote expansion and upset at longer ranges. This 200-grain .338" projectile is able to impart significantly more energy than the 160 gr projectile used in the .308 Marlin Express, despite similar muzzle velocities. Furthermore, the projectile's high ballistic coefficient allows the .338 Marlin Express to maintain velocity to greater distances than big bore lever cartridges such as .45-70, .444 Marlin, or even the high performance .450 Marlin. Although the heavy bullet weight of these cartridges allow them more muzzle energy, the ballistic advantage of the .338 Marlin Express's projectile begins to show beyond 100 yards. After that point the .338 Marlin Express's projectile retains more energy than even the .450 Marlin. Like the .308 Marlin Express, the .338 Marlin Express was designed to be a relatively flat shooting cartridge, taking advantage of the bullets Hornady designed for the rounds. Its trajectory is similar to the .30-06 Springfield.

Comparison

The .338 Marlin Express was designed to produce performance similar to the .30-06 Springfield. This would give lever-action hunters improved performance over their .30-30 Winchester rounds. The table below shows how the rounds compare. Note that reloading data for 200-grain (13 g) bullets for some of the cartridges is not available. Extensive loading data for the .338 Marlin Express is not yet available. The powder used in the Hornady loading is also not yet commercially available as of Feb '09. This round was designed with an elastomer tip, so that the .338 projectile would be safe for use in the tubular magazines of lever-action rifles. Traditional spitzer bullets are not compatible with the tubular magazines. This is due to the danger of the hard, pointed bullet-tip igniting the primer of the round in front of it under recoil impulse. The softer tip eliminates the hazards of stacking pointed rounds end to end in a tubular magazine.

See also
.30-06 Springfield
.308 Marlin Express
.30-30 Winchester
.338 Federal
List of rifle cartridges
Table of handgun and rifle cartridges
8 mm caliber

References

External links
Hornady official .338 Marlin Express page with background info on cartridge

338 Marlin Express